Bonerate is an Austronesian language spoken in the Taka Bonerate Islands off South Sulawesi, Indonesia.

References

Muna–Buton languages
Languages of Sulawesi